The collared whitestart (Myioborus torquatus), also known as the collared redstart, is a tropical New World warbler endemic to the mountains of Costa Rica and western-central Panama.

Description 
It has a chestnut crown bordered with black, and a black forehead. The rest of the upper parts are slaty black, and the tail is black with white edges, hence the bird's name: "start" is an old English word for "tail". The face and underparts are bright yellow, with a black band across the breast.

The sexes are similar, but young birds are duller, with a browner back, weakly yellow underparts, and the head entirely slate-coloured, with no yellow on the face or red on the crown.

Behaviour 

The call is a sharp pit, and the song is a mixture of slurred whistles, warbles and trills.

The collared whitestart feeds on insects, frequently fanning its striking tail as it pursues its prey. It will join mixed feeding flocks, and will follow cattle and occasionally humans for the insects they flush.

The roofed nest has a round side entrance and is built on the ground or a steep bank, hidden amongst rocks, tufts of grass or under a fallen log. It is constructed from strips of bark, plant fibres, leaves, and grass. From March to May, the female will lay 2 or 3 white or cream eggs that are speckled with fine brown spots. Incubation lasts about two weeks, but other nesting details are largely unknown.

Habitat 
The collared whitestart is common at heights between 1500 m and the timberline in mossy mountain forests, ravines, second growth, and adjacent pastures.

References 

 Curson, Quinn and Beadle, New World Warblers  
 Stiles and Skutch, A guide to the birds of Costa Rica

Further reading

External links 
 
 

collared whitestart
Birds of Costa Rica
Birds of Panama
collared whitestart
collared whitestart